Katarzyna Broniatowska (born 22 February 1990) is a Polish athlete specializing in the middle distance events. She won the bronze medal in 1500 metres at the 2013 European Indoor Championships in Gothenburg.

Competition record

References
 IAAF profile

1990 births
Living people
Polish female middle-distance runners
Place of birth missing (living people)
Competitors at the 2013 Summer Universiade
Competitors at the 2011 Summer Universiade
20th-century Polish women
21st-century Polish women